The men's 4 × 200 metre freestyle relay event at the 2015 European Games in Baku took place on 25 June at the Aquatic Palace.

Results

Heats
The heats were started at 10:36.

Final
The final was held at 19:54.

References

Men's 4 x 200 metre freestyle relay